Bernardo Bellotto  (c. 1721/2 or 30 January 172117 November 1780), was an Italian urban landscape painter or vedutista, and printmaker in etching famous for his vedute of European cities – Dresden, Vienna, Turin, and Warsaw. He was the student and nephew of the renowned Giovanni Antonio Canal Canaletto and sometimes used the latter's illustrious name, signing himself as Bernardo Canaletto. In Germany and Poland, Bellotto called himself by his uncle's name, Canaletto. This caused some confusion, however Bellotto’s work is more sombre in color than Canaletto's and his depiction of clouds and shadows brings him closer to Dutch painting.

Bellotto's style was characterized by elaborate representation of architectural and natural vistas, and by the specific quality of each place's lighting. It is plausible that Bellotto, and other Venetian masters of vedute, may have used the camera obscura in order to achieve superior precision of urban views.

Life

Bellotto was born in Venice, the son of Lorenzo Antonio Bellotto and Fiorenza Canal, sister of the famous Canaletto, and studied in his uncle's workshop.

In 1742 he moved to Rome, where he produced vedute of that city. In 1744 and 1745 he traveled northern Italy, again depicting vedute of each city. Among others, he worked for Charles Emmanuel III of Savoy.

From 1747 to 1758 he moved to Dresden, following an invitation from King Augustus III of Poland. He created paintings of the cities Dresden and Pirna and their surroundings. Today these paintings preserve a memory of Dresden's former beauty, which was destroyed by bombing during World War II.

His international reputation grew, and in 1758 he accepted an invitation from Empress Maria Theresa to come to Vienna, where he painted views of the city's monuments.

In 1761 Bellotto left Vienna for Munich, where he spent almost a year. In a letter to her cousin Maria Antonia of Bavaria, Empress Maria Theresia had praised Bellotto's artistic achievements at the Viennese court. Logically, he was commissioned works by the ruling family of Bavaria. He painted a panoramic view of Munich and two vedute of Nymphenburg Palace for the elector of Bavaria. At the end of 1761, Bellotto returned to Dresden.

When King Augustus III of Poland, also an Elector of Saxony, who usually lived in Dresden, died in 1763, Bellotto's work became less important in Dresden. As a consequence, he left Dresden to seek employment in Saint Petersburg at the court of Catherine II of Russia. On his way to Saint Petersburg, however, Bellotto accepted an invitation in 1764 from Poland's newly elected King Stanislaus Augustus Poniatowski to become his court painter in Warsaw from 1768.

Here he remained some 16 years, for the rest of his life, as court painter to the King, for whom he painted numerous views of the Polish capital and its environs for the Royal Castle in Warsaw, complement of the great historical paintings commissioned by Poniatowski from Marcello Bacciarelli. His initial commissions included painted decoration of the Ujazdów Castle between 1767 and 1770, of which a study of illusionistic vault is the only preserved example of profuse decoration lost in 1784 during the reconstruction of the castle into military barracks.

In 1769 the painter and his son Lorenzo (1744–1770) accomplished another large royal commission – fourteen views of Rome, ancient and papal, based on the collection of etchings by Giovanni Battista Piranesi entitled Vedute di Roma. The collection was dispersed in the early nineteenth century and today various paintings can be admired in different museums in Russia – The Roman Forum as seen from the Capitol to the south-east and Piazza della Rotonda with Pantheon (Museum of Fine Arts in Moscow), View of the Piazza Navona (State Museum in Gorky), View of S. Maria Maggiore (Museum of Art in Khabarovsk) and in private collections.

His paintings of Warsaw, 26 vedute painted between 1770–80 to embellish the so-called Panorama Room (later Canaletto Room) at the Royal Castle in Warsaw and later relocated to Russia, were restored to the Polish Government in 1921 and were used in rebuilding the city after its near-complete destruction by German troops during World War II.

Bellotto's early work bears strong features of his uncle's style, becoming more individual and distinguished in later years with clear inspiration of Dutch landscape painting with massed clouds, cast shadows and rich foliage. His colouring is colder and characterized by a steely grey. 
 
The last period of the artist's work is assessed as distinct from the earlier stages with emphasis on the immediacy of observation, striving for a generic treatment of staffage, ability to capture the atmosphere of the place and visible transformation of his painting which become more colorful with warmer tones. For the first time he also undertook historical subjects including Election of Stanislaus Augustus (1778) for the King and Entry of Jerzy Ossoliński into Rome in 1633 (1779) commissioned by Józef Maksymilian Ossoliński. Bellotto created a school of painting which was later continued and developed by Zygmunt Vogel and Marcin Zaleski.

Bernardo Bellotto died in Warsaw in 1780 and was buried in Capuchin Church at Miodowa Street.

His younger brother was named Pietro Bellotto (1725 – c. 1805) and after collaborating with Canaletto and his brother, moved to France, where he was known as le Sieur Canalety and Pietro Bellotti di Caneletty. The brother was also referred to as Belloti, Belloty, Beloty, or Bellottit.

Works by subject

Italy

Venice and Veneto
 The Grand Canal facing Santa Croce (c.1738) National Gallery
 Piazza san Marco, 1740 ca., Cleveland (Ohio), Cleveland Museum of Art
 The Grand Canal in Venice (c.1740) Musée des Beaux-Arts de Lyon
 Capriccio with the Campidoglio (c.1742) Galleria Nazionale di Parma
 Piazza del Campidoglio with Santa Maria d'Aracoeli, Rome (c1743) Petworth House 
 Venice - the campo dell'Arsenale (c.1743), National Gallery of Canada, Ottawa
 View of Piazza san Marco Museo civico Amedeo Lia, La Spezia
 The ponte delle Navi in Verona (1746-1747)View looking north at Powis Castle, view looking south on long-term loan to National Gallery of Scotland

Other
 Rovine del Foro romano (c.1743), National Gallery of Victoria, Melbourne
 View of Vaprio d'Adda (1744), Metropolitan Museum of Art, New York
 View of the Villa Perabò poi Melzi in Gazzada (c.1744), Pinacoteca di Brera, Milan
 View of Turin with the Palazzo Reale (1745) Galleria Sabauda, Turin
 View of the old bridge over the Po in Turin(1745) Galleria Sabauda, Turin

Dresden and Saxony
 Dresden From the Right Bank of the Elbe Above the Augustus Bridge (1747) Gemäldegalerie Alte Meister
 The New Market in Dresden (c.1747) Hermitage Museum, St Petersburg
 The Hofkirche in Dresden with the castle and the Augustus bridge (Dresden from the left bank of the Elbe) (1748) Pinacoteca Giovanni e Marella Agnelli, Turin
 The New Market in Dresden seen from Moritzstrasse (c.1750) Pinacoteca Giovanni e Marella Agnelli, Turin
 View of Dresden with the Frauenkirche (1750-1752) Gemäldegalerie Alte Meister, Dresden
 Square with the Kreuzkirche in Dresden (1751-1752) Hermitage Museum, St Petersburg
 Marketplace at Pirna (c. 1764) Museum of Fine Arts, Houston

1756-1758 series
 The Fortress of Königstein: Courtyard with the Brunnenhaus Manchester Art Gallery
 The Fortress of Königstein: Courtyard with the Magdalenenburg Manchester Art Gallery
 The Fortress of Königstein from the North National Gallery, London
 'The Fortress of Königstein from the South-West (private collection, Earl of Derby)
 The Fortress of Königstein (National Gallery of Art, Washington)

Warsaw
 Church of the Sisters of St Bernard and the Column of Sigismund III in Warsaw from the descent towards the Vistula (1768-1770) Royal Castle, Warsaw
 View of Warsaw with the Vistula from the Praga Suburb (1770) Royal Castle, Warsaw
 View of the Wilanòw Meadows (1775) Royal Castle, Warsaw
 Miodowa Street in Warsaw (1777) Royal Castle, Warsaw
 Kraninski Square in Warsaw (1778) Royal Castle, Warsaw
 Iron-Gate Square in Warsaw (1779) Royal Castle, Warsaw
 The Carmelite Church in Warsaw (1780) Royal Castle, Warsaw

Other
 Das kaiserliche Lustschloß Schönbrunn, Ehrenhofseite (1759–1760) Kunsthistorisches Museum, Vienna
 Vienna seen from the Belvedere (1758-1761) Kunsthistorisches Museum, Vienna
 Capriccio with Christ Driving the Moneylenders from the Temple (1765-1766) National Museum, Warsaw
Capriccio with a River and Bridge (ca.1745) Thyssen-Bornemisza Museum, Madrid

Notes

References
Beddington, Charles. Bernardo Bellotto and His Circle in Italy. Part I: Not Canaletto but Bellotto. Burlington Magazine 146, no. 1216 (Cct. 2004): 665–674.
" Bernardo, zwany [known as] Canaletto", Encyklopedia Polski, p. 42.
STEPHANE LOIRE, HANNA MALACHOWICZ, KRZYSTOF POMIAN, ANDRZEJ ROTTERMUND. "Bernardo Bellotto, Un pittore veneziano a Varsavia" . Book edited by Andrzej Rottermund, Director of the Royal Castle at Warszawa and Henry Loirette, Director of the Louvre Museum (Paris), from the Louvre Museum Exhibition of Bernardo Bellotto at the Warszawa Royal Castle from 7 October 2004 to 10 January 2005. 5 Continents Editions srl, Milano, (2004). . 134 pages with over 65 big size color photographs within.

External links
 
 
 Biography and Gallery
 Bernardo Bellotto in the "A World History of Art"
 Bernardo Bellotto in the "WikiArt"
 Gallery of Canaletto's paintings, in particular many views of Dresden and Warsaw
 How Bellotto's illustrations were used as inspiration to rebuild Warsaw's Old Town
 National Trust images of the collection at Petworth house

1720s births
1780 deaths
Republic of Venice artists
18th-century Italian painters
Italian male painters
Italian printmakers
Italian vedutisti
Court painters
Italian expatriates in Germany
Culture in Dresden
Italian expatriates in Austria
Court painters of Polish kings
Italian emigrants to Poland
Italian expatriates in Poland
Academic staff of the Dresden Academy of Fine Arts
18th-century Italian male artists